Felsom Film was a film production company which operated in Weimar Germany between 1922 and 1933. It was founded and run by producers Hermann Fellner and Josef Somlo. The company's name is a blend of their surnames.

During the 1920s, the firm embarked on a series of co-productions with the British studio Gainsborough Pictures. In September 1929, the company released Land Without Women, the first German language part-talkie, ahead of the German company UFA, which did not release Melody of the Heart until December 1929. Following the Nazi takeover, they dissolved their company and fled into exile in Britain.

Partial filmography
 Dancing Mad (1925)
 A Modern Dubarry (1927)
 The Woman on the Rack (1928)
 Number 17 (1928)
 Strauss Is Playing Today (1928)
 The Great Adventuress (1928)
 The Gallant Hussar (1928)
 The Wrecker (1929)
 The Fourth from the Right (1929)
 Land Without Women (1929)
 Three Days of Love (1931)
 Mädchen zum Heiraten (1932)

References

Bibliography
 Bergfelder, Tim & Cargnelli, Christian. Destination London: German-speaking emigrés and British cinema, 1925–1950. Berghahn Books, 2008.

German film studios
Film production companies of Germany
Mass media companies established in 1922
Mass media companies disestablished in 1933
1933 disestablishments in Germany
German companies established in 1922